Events from the year 1782 in Canada.

Incumbents
Monarch: George III

Governors
Governor of the Province of Quebec: Frederick Haldimand
Governor of Nova Scotia: 
Commodore-Governor of Newfoundland: John Byron
Governor of St. John's Island: Walter Patterson

Events
 1782–83: A smallpox epidemic hits the Sanpoil of Washington.
 Montreal Upper Yellowstone, on old Indian trail along east slope of the mountains, challenging Spanish trade goods.
 January 1 – Threatened by three hostile forces, Vermont is advised by Gen. George Washington, a skilled surveyor, to limit jurisdiction to undisputed territory.
 February 22 – Vermont accepts the prescribed delimitation.
 March 1 – It is proposed, in Congress, to treat Vermont as hostile, failing submission to the terms of 20 August 1781, and to divide it between New York and New Hampshire, along the ridge of the Green Mountains; and that the Commander-in-chief employ the Congressional forces to further this resolution.
 In the course of this year John Molson, the future pioneer of Canadian steam navigation, arrives in Canada.
 Councillor Finlay proposes to establish English schools in Canadian parishes, and to prohibit using the French language in the Law Courts after a certain time.

Births
 March 31: Jesse Ketchum, tanner, politician, and philanthropist (d.1867)

Deaths
 April 11: Jean-Baptiste de La Brosse, Jesuit, priest, missionary, and professor (b.1724) 
 May 21: Robert Monckton, army officer and colonial administrator (b. 1726)

Full date unknown
 Matonabbee, leading Indian (b.1737)

Historical documents

American Revolutionary War
Thomas Pownall says Britain needs to defend Quebec and Nova Scotia to supply lumber, fish and livestock to West Indies, and be naval and trade centres

Seneca chiefs expect Crown to give them new homeland after loss of theirs (Note: horrific scalping victim descriptions just above chiefs' message)

Moses Hazen's lengthy plan for invading Canada (Note: "savages" used)

Prisoners released at Montreal report John Johnson taking goods and arms to Indigenous nations on Great Lakes, who are likely "to Streighten our frontier"

Report that Seneca sachem accused British of lying, saying that British have lost war and will sacrifice Seneca, who must look out for themselves

By vote of 194 to 193, House of Commons rejects "motion for an address to his Majesty to put an end to hostilities in America"

Guy Carleton tells Washington that, "if war must prevail, I shall endeavour to render its miseries as light to the people of this continent" as possible

"Remonstrance of the Loyal Refugees at New York to Sir Guy Carleton, on the negociation for a general peace, and craving protection"

Preliminary Britain-U.S.A. peace treaty restores fishing rights, encourages return of loyalists' property and freedom, and prohibits removing "any Negroes"

Lewis Nicola considers republics not as strong as monarchies, and foresees Canada one day becoming monarchy that will "prove too powerful" for U.S.A.

John Adams foresees Britain being "forever at War" with U.S.A. if it retains Canada and Nova Scotia, which would end in Britain's "final Ruin"

"Britain will sustain the expence and America reap the advantage" - Tom Paine says Halifax will be useless after war and Canadian settlers will go south

Canada
Preface (1782) to assessment (1774) of Quebec Act hopes Canadians will follow more enlightened Catholic leadership (Note: anti-Catholic statements)

Canada cost British government almost £5.3 million in 1776-1782, more than its import/export trade amount (and some big expenses yet to be accounted)

British defeat of French fleet brings sailors and others parading Quebec City streets, "and the next morning discover'd a good deal of work for the glaziers"

"Our Assembly" was held in new room built by Levy Solomons; "the Country dances began at eight o'clock and continued till two," to satisfaction of all

Daily except Thursdays, 11-2, young ladies to be taught "Writing, Arithmetic, the Rules for Reading with propriety, the English and French Grammars" etc.

Missing German indentured servant, tailor by trade, "has very much the art and behaviour of a sham beau and has a variety of cloaths;" 5 guinea reward

Shoemaker apprentice missing, "had on when he went away a Blanket Coat, light blue Waistcoat and Breeches very dirty, a Check Shirt much wore[....]"

New 2-storey log house at Chambly fit for tavern or shop, with 3 large rooms on first floor, 4 bedrooms on second, plus garret and "good warm cellar"

Single middle-age man wanted who "can comb Hair, cut wood, dress a beef-stake occasionally, receive messages [and give] as little trouble as possible"

Map: Canada from Lake Superior to St. Lawrence estuary, and territory from James Bay to Pennsylvania, with numerous rivers and Indigenous groups

Map: St. Lawrence River from Lake Ontario to Anticosti Island, with hazards and other features and detailed navigation instructions

Nova Scotia
Carleton says 600+ Loyalists moving to Nova Scotia to take up cost-free grants of 600-acres will be "a large accession of strength [and] population"

Agents of Loyalists going to Nova Scotia are to find tract(s) of land free of title dispute, and record aspects of soil, timber, game, rivers etc.

Powder, shot, food and other supplies delivered to needy Mi'kmaq ("poor Indian Woman & family," "Indian family consisting of eight" and "old Indians")

As "detriment to trade, and an encouragement to many idle persons to avoid being employed in useful trades," travelling peddlers must be licensed

Nova Scotia has massive trade deficit with England (approximately 22 to 1) in 1782

People outside Halifax are left too few soldiers to defend them from enemy raids, requiring farmers to either keep watch themselves or hire men at $2/day

"The Americans surprise and pillage the town of Lunenburgh, Nova Scotia"

Prince Edward Island
"The principal settlers on St. John's, Gulf of St. Lawrence, invite the Royal Refugees at New York"

Helen MacDonald tells brother John that she's been extravagant because she was left alone without "rules" and expected brothers would soon return

Newfoundland
In peace talks with France, British ambassador is to "point out in the strongest manner the high national value which is set on" Newfoundland fisheries

"St John's is an excellent good Harbour (though narrow in the Entrance)," but don't confuse it with nearby Quiddy Viddy and its hill "called Cuckold's Head"

Hudson Bay
At York Factory: armourer repairing guns, shipwright and carpenter helving hatchets, tailors making trade clothing, joiner and smith doing odd jobs, etc.

Indigenous people describe "eruption on the skin" raging among their people and causing high mortality in neighbourhood of Cumberland House

French struggle through ice and gales, tides and mud to burn Hudson's Bay Company's Fort Prince of Wales and Fort York (Note: "savages" used)

Elsewhere
At Niagara, John Butler says farmers "have done very well" despite lack of blacksmith and provisions, and some Rangers asking to join them with families

References 

 
Canada
82